Saint Placidus (Placitus), along with Saints Eutychius (Euticius), Victorinus and their sister Flavia, Donatus, Firmatus the deacon, Faustus, and thirty others, have been venerated as Christian martyrs. They were said to be martyred either by pirates at Messina or under the Emperor Diocletian.

In their Acts, this Placidus was confused with a saint of the same name who was a follower of St. Benedict. Thus, the legend of this unknown Sicilian martyr has him go to Italy in 541, and found a monastery at Messina, of which he was abbot, and where he was said to have been martyred with thirty companions.

The feast day of the martyr saints was not in the Tridentine Calendar, but was included in the General Roman Calendar from its 1588 to 1962 editions for celebration on 5 October, the feast day of the two monks who were disciples of Saint Benedict of Nursia from their boyhood, Saint Maurus and Placidus. Some traditionalist Catholics continue to observe pre-1970 calendars.

References

Gallery

External links
Catholic Online: Saint Flavia
Saint প্ল্যাসিড

4th-century deaths
Italian saints
4th-century Christian martyrs
4th-century Romans
Year of birth unknown